Pulldown may refer to:
Pulldown (casting), a type of casting defect
Pull-down resistor, a type of resistor use
Pull-down assay, a biochemical protein extraction technique
Pull-down menu. See Menu (computing)

Fitness
Pulldown exercise, a compound exercise designed to stress and develop the Latissimus dorsi.
A mark (Australian football)

Media
Negative pulldown,  the difference between 2-, 3-, and 4-perf movie camera frame movements
Pull-down curtain
Telecine, the methods of 3:2 pulldown in video conversion

See also
Pull up (disambiguation)